Michael Watson  (born 15 March 1965) is a British former professional boxer who competed from 1984 to 1991. He held the Commonwealth middleweight title from 1989 to 1991, and challenged three times for a world title between 1990 and 1991. Watson's career was cut short as a result of near-fatal injury sustained during a loss to Chris Eubank for the WBO super-middleweight title in 1991.

Amateur career
Watson took up boxing at the age of fourteen at the Crown and Manor boxing club, where he proved to be a quick learner, winning an under-71 kg London Schools title in 1980.

He had an impressive 20–2 record at the Crown and Manor Club. He transferred to the Colvestone Boxing Club where he trained and sparred for over a year with Kirkland Laing, Dennis Andries, and Darren Dyer. He entered the 1983/84 Nationals at under 75 kg and won the title. On his 19th birthday he fought John Beckles during the 1984 London ABAs, both being national champions. Watson, initially seen as the underdog, won the fight in just over 30 seconds, and was seen as a hope for a boxing medal at the 1984 Los Angeles Olympic Games. However, his place on the Olympic team was taken by Liverpool's Brian Schumacher.

Professional career
Watson's professional career lasted from 1984 to 1991. The highlight was his May 1989 victory over Nigel Benn to secure the British Commonwealth middleweight title. This led to a world title clash with Jamaican Mike McCallum, who defeated Watson by a knockout in the eleventh round.

On 22 June 1991 at Earl's Court, he met Chris Eubank in another opportunity for the world middleweight title. Eubank won by a majority decision of 116–113, 115–113 and 114–114, close enough to support dissension by some commentators and supporters.

Rematch with Eubank and career-ending injury
A rematch was arranged on 21 September 1991 at White Hart Lane, this time for the vacant WBO super middleweight title. In round 11, with Watson ahead on points and seemingly on the verge of a stoppage victory, he knocked Eubank down with an overhand right. Moments later, Eubank was back on his feet and connected with a devastating uppercut, which caused Watson to fall back and hit the back of his head against the ropes. 

Referee Roy Francis stopped the fight in round 12, after which Watson collapsed in the ring. There was no ambulance or paramedic at the event. Doctors wearing dinner jackets arrived after some eight minutes, during which time the fallen fighter received no oxygen. A total of 28 minutes elapsed before Watson received treatment in a hospital neurosurgical unit. He spent 40 days in a coma and had six brain operations to remove a blood clot.

After regaining consciousness, he spent over a year in intensive care and rehabilitation and six more years confined to a wheelchair while he slowly recovered some movement and regained the ability to speak and write.
Peter Hamlyn, the consultant neurosurgeon who operated on Watson, said in 2010, "I think back to those first days, and the milestone moments. The first eight months were so depressing. He couldn't hear, couldn't speak, couldn't walk. Slowly, he clawed it all back. So extraordinary".

Life after boxing
Watson sued the British Boxing Board of Control (BBBoC) for negligence and won damages reputedly of around £1 million. The High Court ruled that the BBBoC was responsible for medical provision at a fight and that administering oxygen and resuscitation on site would have made a considerable difference to Watson's outcome. Mr Justice Kennedy said that the board was "in breach of its duty to Mr Watson". This decision was upheld at the Court of Appeal, and the BBBoC did not appeal to the House of Lords, selling their London headquarters to pay out a £400,000 compensation settlement. The judge said that this was "sadly a long way short of the damages that [Watson] would have received had the defendants had the money or had they been insured".

On 19 April 2003 Watson completed the London Marathon, walking two hours each morning and afternoon for six days. Raising money for the Brain and Spine Foundation, Watson slept overnight in a support bus.
Finishing the race by his side were Chris Eubank and his neurosurgeon, both of whom had become his personal friends. On 4 February 2004 Watson was awarded the MBE by Queen Elizabeth II for his services to disability sport. Watson was announced as a torchbearer in the 2012 Paralympic relay.

In February 2017 Watson and his carer, Lennard Ballack, were victims of a carjacking in Chingford, London. During the attack, Ballack had ammonia sprayed in his face and was beaten, whilst Watson was dragged along the road when the car was driven off, unable to escape. Watson suffered flashbacks and seizures after the event. The two attackers were later sentenced to 16 years for their part in the attack and other crimes.

Professional boxing record

References

External links

Final two rounds of Eubank vs. Watson II at YouTube

1965 births
Living people
English male boxers
Middleweight boxers
Super-middleweight boxers
English people of Jamaican descent
People with traumatic brain injuries
Commonwealth Boxing Council champions
People with severe brain damage